XHESE-FM is a radio station on 96.7 FM in Champotón, Campeche, Mexico. The station is owned by Núcleo Comunicación del Sureste and carries La Ke Buena national grupera format.

History
XESE-AM 1560 received its concession on October 16, 1970. It was owned by Manuel Rodríguez Escoffie and authorized as a daytimer with 5 kilowatts (though it actually operated with 250 watts). The station was sold to the current concessionaire in 1994.

In 2011, XESE was cleared to migrate to FM as XHESE-FM 96.7; it then moved its FM transmitter again in 2015.

References

Regional Mexican radio stations
Radio stations in Campeche